This is a list of venues used for professional baseball in Syracuse, New York. The information is a compilation of the information contained in the references listed. All of the regular home fields have been within a half mile or so of Onondaga Lake, and were sometimes subject to flooding in early spring.

Baseball parks in Syracuse 

Lakeside Park
Home of:
Syracuse Stars - independent (1875-1876) / League Alliance (1877 only)
Syracuse Stars - National League (1879, Sunday games only - although Retrosheet indicates no Sunday home games at all )
Location: Geddes, New York, bordering Syracuse to the southeast - boundaries from various sources, not absolutely certain: New York Central Railroad (northeast); Bridge Street (north - now parts of Saint Mark's Avenue and West Fayette Street); State Fair Boulevard (west); Delaware, Lackawanna and Western Railroad aka West Shore Railroad embankment (southwest); Marsh Road (later Hiawatha Boulevard) (southeast); Onondaga Lake (east)
Currently: probably New York State Fair parking lot

Newell Park or Star Park
Home of:
Syracuse Stars – International Association (1878 only)
Syracuse Stars – National League (1879 part)
Location: Croton (later East Raynor) Street (north); South Salina Street (west)
Currently: commercial buildings

Star Park
Home of:
Syracuse Stars – New York State League (1885) 
Syracuse Stars – International League (1886-1887)
Syracuse Stars – International Association (1888-1889)
Syracuse Stars – American Association (1890)
Syracuse Stars - Eastern Association (1891 only) 
Syracuse Stars - Eastern League (1892 part)
Syracuse Stars - Eastern League (1894-1899)
Syracuse Stars - New York State League (1902–1904)
Location: South Salina Street (northeast); Delaware Lakawanna & Western Railroad (east); toward Temple Street (north); Oneida Street (west); West Taylor Street (south); a couple of long blocks north of Newell Park; block later bisected north-to-south by Baker (now South Clinton) Street
Currently: power station, railroad tracks, commercial buildings

Three Rivers Park
Home of: Syracuse Stars – AA (1890, 5 Sunday games in May–June-July)
Location: Phoenix, New York, about ten miles north-northwest of Syracuse

Iron Pier
Home of: Syracuse Stars – AA (1890, 1 scheduled Sunday game, August 3, forfeited by Louisville)
Location: Iron Pier resort area at the southeast "corner" of Onondaga Lake
Currently: park land

Athletic Field or New Star Park
Home of:
Syracuse Stars – Eastern League (1900 – mid-1901)
Syracuse Stars – New York State League (1905–1906)
Syracuse (not confirmed) – Empire State League (second half of 1906 only)
Location: Marsh Street (later Hiawatha Boulevard West) (northwest); Pulaski Street (would be northeast); Liberty Street (would be southwest); Old Lakeside Boulevard (?)
Currently: industrial

Hallock Park aka Star Park aka First Ward Park
Home of:
Syracuse Stars – New York State League (1907–1917)
Syracuse Stars – International League (1918 only)
Location: end of North Salina Street (southwest?) "not far from" Onondaga Lake; toward Hiawatha Boulevard (southeast); Park Street (northeast), across Park from what is now Regional Market; about a mile north of Athletic Park
Currently: ramps for Interstate Highway 81

Archbold Stadium
Home of: Syracuse Stars – Eastern League 1920
while awaiting completion of the next Star Park
normally the Syracuse University stadium
Location: Irving Avenue (west); Forestry Drive (south); Crouse Drive (north and east)
Currently: Carrier Dome

Star Park aka Syracuse Athletic Park orig. International League Park
Home of:
Syracuse Stars – International League 1920-1927
Syracuse Stars – New York–Pennsylvania League (1928 – mid-1929)
Location: 1420 West Genesee Street (south); State Fair Boulevard (east); New York Central Railroad and Erie Boulevard (west); Harbor Brook (north)
Currently: Star Park Apartments.

MacArthur Stadium orig. Municipal Stadium
Home of:
Syracuse Chiefs – International League (1934–1955)
Syracuse Chiefs – Eastern League (1956 – mid-1957)
Syracuse Chiefs – International League (1961–1996)
Location: 820 Second North Street (southwest, home plate); East Hiawatha Boulevard (southeast, right field); Grant Boulevard (orig. Third North Street) (northeast, center field)
Formerly: LeMoyne Park
Currently: parking lot southeast of NBT Bank Stadium

Damaschke Field in Oneonta, New York
Falcon Park in Auburn, New York
Home of: Syracuse Chiefs – International League (May and June, 1969)
during repairs to MacArthur Stadium after arson fire on May 15, 1969

NBT Bank Stadium orig. P&C Stadium, then Alliance Bank Stadium
Home of: Syracuse Chiefs – International League (1997 to date)
Location: 1 Tex Simone Drive; Tex Simone Drive (southeast, first base around home plate to southwest, third base); railroad tracks (northeast to northwest, surrounding outfield); creek to Onondaga Lake (northwest, left field); Hiawatha Boulevard farther southeast
Formerly: parking lot northwest of MacArthur Stadium

See also 
 Lists of baseball parks

References 

 Peter Filichia, Professional Baseball Franchises, Facts on File, 1993.

External links 

Syracuse Chiefs ballpark history
Retrosheet ballparks directory
Gersbacher, Ron. (2012). "History of Syracuse Baseball, 1858 to Present"

Syracuse

baseball parks